Gilligan's Island is an American sitcom created and produced by Sherwood Schwartz and originally produced by United Artists Television. The series aired for three seasons on the CBS network from September 26, 1964, to April 17, 1967.

Series overview

Episodes

Pilot (1992)

Season 1 (1964–65) 

The first season aired Saturdays at 8:30-9:00 p.m. (EST). This is the only season to be filmed in black and white.

Season 2 (1965–66) 

The second season aired Thursdays at 8:00-8:30 p.m. (EST).

Season 3 (1966–67) 

The third season aired Mondays at 7:30-8:00 p.m. (EST).

Television films (1978–2001) 
There were three sequel films. The first (1978) had them rescued and proved so successful that it spawned a second (1979) and third (1981). By the third film, ratings were down, and no more were made.

In 2001, Dawn Wells co-produced a television film bio-pic, where she, Bob Denver, and Russell Johnson appear as themselves as hosts and remember what life was like during the series. In the memory scenes, they and the rest of the cast are played by different actors, while Wells narrates.

Home media 
This series has been released on DVD by Warner Home Video, in three season box sets (the first of which includes the pilot episode) and in a complete series set. There has also been a single-disc release containing only the first two episodes.

References

Further reading

External links 
 
 Fan site episode list

Gilligan's Island
Gilligan's Island